The Etteh Aro and Partners Consulting Engineers is a civil engineering consultancy, headquartered in Ibadan, the capital of Oyo State southwestern Nigeria. The firm was established on 29 April 1970 by the late Lawrence Oluwawemimo Arokodare in partnership with Engr. Ikpong Ikpong Etteh.
In early 1970's, the firm awarded scholarships to 51 engineers in Nigeria to obtained masters and doctorate degree in engineering. It also sponsored the engineering training of over 400 Nigerians.

References

Engineering consulting firms